The DynaFlex can refer to

 Dynaflex (RCA) a thin,  lightweight vinyl phonograph record developed by RCA Records
 DynaFlex International, a company that manufactures Gyroscopic Exercise tools